Morning's at Seven (German: Morgens um Sieben ist die Welt noch in Ordnung) is a 1968 West German family comedy film directed by Kurt Hoffmann and starring Gerlinde Locker, Peter Arens and Werner Hinz. It was based on the 1965 novel Morning's at Seven by the British writer Eric Malpass. A sequel When Sweet Moonlight Is Sleeping in the Hills was released the following year with much of the same cast.

It was shot at the Spandau Studios in Berlin and on location around Solingen in North Rhine-Westphalia and Großenbrode and Fehmarn on the Baltic in Schleswig-Holstein. The film's sets were designed by the art directors Isabella Schlichting and Werner Schlichting.

Cast
 Archibald Eser as 	Gaylord
 Gerlinde Locker as 	May
 Peter Arens as Jocelyn
 Werner Hinz as Grandfather
 Agnes Windeck as 	Aunt Marigold
 Maria Körber as Rose
 Diana Körner as 	Becky
 Gerd Vespermann as Roberts
 Herbert Bötticher as 	Stan
 Rolf Zacher as Peter
 Eva Lissa as 	Frau Fogerty
 Gerd Lohmeyer as Willy
 Wolfgang Petry as Bert
 Lu Säuberlich as Tante Bea
 Charles Hans Vogt as Onkel Ben
 Dinah Hinz as Fräulein Marston
 Dirk Reichert as David

References

Bibliography 
 Bock, Hans-Michael & Bergfelder, Tim. The Concise CineGraph. Encyclopedia of German Cinema. Berghahn Books, 2009.

External links 
 

1968 films
West German films
German comedy films
1968 comedy films
1960s German-language films
Films directed by Kurt Hoffmann
Constantin Film films
Films shot at Spandau Studios
Films based on British novels
1960s German films